Wesley Goodwin (born December 28, 1984) is an American football coach who is currently the defensive coordinator and linebackers coach at Clemson University. He previously served as an assistant coach for the Arizona Cardinals and at Mississippi State University.

Arizona Cardinals 
In 2015, Goodwin was hired by the Arizona Cardinals as the assistant to the head coach. Goodwin served under head coach Bruce Arians.

Clemson (second stint) 
In 2018, Goodwin returned to Clemson University as a senior defensive assistant.

On December 14, 2021, Goodwin was promoted to defensive coordinator and linebackers coach at Clemson, replacing Brent Venables after his departure to become the head coach at the University of Oklahoma.

References

External links
Clemson Tigers bio

1984 births
Living people
People from Grove Hill, Alabama
Coaches of American football from Alabama
Arizona Cardinals coaches
Clemson Tigers football coaches
Mississippi State Bulldogs football coaches

Mississippi State University alumni